Palio is the name given in Italy to an annual athletic contest, very often of a historical character, pitting the neighbourhoods of a town or the hamlets of a comune against each other. Typically, they are fought in costume and commemorate some event or tradition of the Middle Ages and thus often involve horse racing, archery, jousting, crossbow shooting, and similar medieval sports. Once purely a matter of local rivalries, many have now become events that are staged with an eye to visitors and foreign tourists.

The Palio di Siena is the only one that has been run without interruption since it started in the 1630s and is definitely the most famous all over the world. Its historical origins are documented since 1239 even though the version seen today was the final evolution of races held from the second half of the 16th century. In 1935, Italian Prime Minister Benito Mussolini sent out an official declaration that only the one of Siena could bring the designation of Palio. All other horse races held in various parts of Italy are actually just modern reenactments. After the Second World War, nevertheless, many other palios arose throughout the various regions of Italy, which could be considered just attempts of imitation of the Palio di Siena. Here is an incomplete list:

Italian Palios

Palios with horse races

Tuscany
Palio of Bientina, third Sunday of July
Palio of Buti in honor of St. Anthony the Abbot,
Palio di Castel del Piano of Castel del Piano, racing on 8 September
Palio delle Contrade, in Faella
Palio dei Rioni di Castiglion Fiorentino  the third Sunday of June
Palio of Casole d'Elsa, Second Sunday of July
Palio of Piancastagnaio
Palio di Fucecchio, at the end of May
Palio in Montelaterone
Palio in Monticiano
Palio di Siena, race is held on 2 July and 16 August
Palio della Costa Etrusca in San Vincenzo (suspended)
Palio del Valdarno, a Faella, in Pian di Scò
Palio in Pian di Scò, on 7 August
Palio delle Bandiere e dei Territori in Follonica
Palio di San Luca in Impruneta in October

Lazio
Corsa a vuoto of Ronciglione, a Carnival feast. In August
Palio del Tirreno of Maccarese-Fiumicino, not held in 2008.
Palio Madama Margarita di Castel Madama, every second Sunday in July
Palio dell'Arcata in Acquapendente
Palio in Bomarzo
Palio del Tributo in Priverno
Palio of Tolfa last Sunday in August
Palio of Sacrofano, Second Sunday in September
Corsa of Formello, on 10 August
Palio di San Matteo, on 22 September
Corsa al Fantino in Capranica
Corsa in Campagnano di Roma
Palio of Selci in September
Corsa of Monterosi, on 15 September
Carosello Storico dei Rioni of Cori, in June and July
Pallio della Carriera in Carpineto Romano (RM).
 Palio delle Quattro Porte – Vallecorsa

Lombardy
Palio della Valle Olona
Palio di Legnano, Last Sunday in May
Palio di S.Pietro at Abbiategrasso
Palio degli Asini in Premosello
Palio of Rho, Second Sunday in October
Palio di Avucat at Caponago, second Sunday in September

Piedmont
Palio di Asti, every third Sunday in September
Palio dei Borghi of Fossano, at the end of June
Palio storico dei Borghi di Avigliana, at Avigliana, Third Sunday in June

Sardinia
Palio of Cagliari
Palio dei Comuni of Fonni,  First Sunday in June
Palio dei Comuni of Goceano
Palio "Sas Carrelas", at Bono
Palio of Sassari

Umbria
Palio (Giostra) del Giglio at Monteleone d'Orvieto, 16 August
Palio di Nera Montoro in September

Veneto
Palio di Feltre First Sunday in August. Horse race and Archery contest
Palio dei 10 Comuni del Montagnanese, at Montagnana, first Sunday in September
Palio delle contrade di Monselice Second and Third Sunday in September.

Marche
Palio dell'Assunta di Fermo, on 15 August
Palio of Montegiorgio
Palio of Sant'Emidio also called Quintana in Ascoli Piceno
Corsa del Drappo in Loreto, on 7 September
Contesa della Margutta a Corridonia, early September
Palio della miniera di zolfo di Cabernardi, early August
Palio dei Castelli in San Severino Marche, early June

Emilia-Romagna
Palio di Ferrara, Last Sunday in May
Palio del Maggio, at Savigno in May
Palio delle contrade in San Secondo Parmense
Palio di Parma,
Palio del Niballo, at Faenza
Palio di Giovecca, at Giovecca
Palio of Mordano

Sicily
Palio of Butera
Palio of Piazza Armerina, 11 to 13 August
Palio dell'Ascensione in Floridia
Palio di San Vincenzo, in Acate

Basilicata
Palio di Sant'Antonio abate in Pignola, on 17 January, a race with Horses, donkeys and mules

Abruzzo
Palio della Giostra Cavalleresca in Sulmona Last Saturday and Sunday of July
Palio della Giostra Cavalleresca dei Borghi più Belli d'Italia – in Sulmona
Palio della Giostra Cavalleresca d'Europa – Sulmona

Puglia
Palio del Viccio of Palo del Colle – held at carnival.

Palios with donkey races

Umbria
Giochi de le Porte of Gualdo Tadino

Lombardy
Corsa cogli Asini of Dairago
Palio degli Asini in Bereguardo
Palio del Cinghiale,  in Cesano Boscone

Piedmont
Palio degli Asini di Alba in Alba
Palio degli Asini di Cocconato in Cocconato
Palio degli Asini di Quarto d'Asti in Quarto d'Asti
Paglio ragliante di Calliano in Calliano
Palio dei Borghi in Venaria

Toscana
Palio dei Ciuchi of Campagnatico, in September
Palio dei Micci of Pozzi, frazione di Seravezza
Palio dei Ciuchi of Carmignano, in September
Palio dei somari of Bagnolo
Palio dei somari of Torrita di Siena
Palio dei Somari of Montepulciano Stazione
Giostra dei sestrieri, Palio dei Ciuchi of Roccatederighi
 Palio de' Ciui of Lugnano
Palio dei somarelli of Vallerona

Campania
 "Il Palio di Somma Vesuviana", second Sunday in September
 "Palio del casale", Palio Nazionale degli asini, Camposano
 "Palio del ciuccio", Cuccaro Vetere.

Lazio
Palio delle Contrade, in Gonfalone di Arpino.
Palio delle Contrade of Corchiano, First Sunday in August
Palio delle Contrade of Allumiere
Palio di San Ciro at Sora

Marche
Palio del Somaro in  Mercatello sul Metauro

Emilia-Romagna
Palio di Ferrara
 Palio di Parma,
Palio dei somari of Grizzana Morandi

Friuli
 Palio dei Borghi di Fagagna, second Sunday in September

Palios with boat races (Palii remieri)

Tuscany
Palio dell'Argentario, in Porto Santo Stefano, 15 August
Palio di Calcinaia of Calcinaia
Palio di San Ranieri,  in Arno and Pisa on 17 June
Palio Madonna del Lago of Massaciuccoli, since 1967

Liguria
Palio Marinaro di San Pietro, at Genoa, first Sunday of July
Palio del Golfo, at La Spezia, first Sunday of August
Palio dei Sestieri, in Ventimiglia, second Sunday in August
Regata dei Rioni di Noli, in Noli, Second Sunday in September

Apulia
Palio of Taranto

Trentino
Palio dell'Oca, in Trento

Veneto
Regata Storica, in Venice

Calabria
Palio di San Giorgio, in Reggio Calabria, on 23 April

Lazio
Palio del mare of Gaeta

Palios with weapons

Tuscany
Palio della balestra in Lucca, on July 12, a crossbow contest
Palio in Pescia, an archery contest
Disfida con l'Arco in Montopoli in Val d'Arno (Pi), an archery contest
Palio del Diotto in Scarperia, on 8 September (one of the games is a knife-throwing)

Umbria
Palio di San Rufino in Assisi, a crossbow competition
Palio dei Terzieri, in August, an archery contest

Lazio
Palio of Orte, an archery contest

Friuli
Palio di San Donato, in Cividale del Friuli, last Sunday in August, an archery contest
Palio of Cordovado, first Sunday of September, an archery contest with a medieval costume parade

Emilia-Romagna
Palio di Santa Reparata e della Romagna Toscana, in Terra del Sole, a crossbow contest

Veneto
Palio della Marciliana, in Chioggia, a crossbow contest.

References

External links

Il Palio Di Siena Official Site
Il Palio Di Siena English Site
Giostra del Saracino
Palio of Asti
Palio of Siena
Palio of Ferrara
Palio dei Rioni, Castiglion Fiorentino
Palio Madama Margarita
Palio of Legnano
Palio della balestra Volterra
Certame della Contea di Popoli
Palio of San Rufino
Palio dei 10 Comuni
Ottava di S. Egidio – Palio of archery

Tourism in Italy
Italian traditions
Festivals in Italy
Sports originating in Italy